Leptobrachella arayai is a species of frog in the family Megophryidae. It is endemic to Sabah, Malaysia. In addition to its type locality, Mount Kinabalu, it is known from Mount Trusmadi, Crocker Range, and Mendolog. Its natural habitats are tropical moist lowland forests, moist montane forests, and rivers. It is threatened by habitat loss.

References

arayai
Amphibians of Borneo
Amphibians of Malaysia
Endemic fauna of Malaysia
Endemic fauna of Borneo
Amphibians described in 1997
Taxa named by Masafumi Matsui
Taxonomy articles created by Polbot